Dommartin is a commune in the Rhône department in eastern France.

History 
On January 7, 1944, former Senator Joseph Serlin was executed at Dommartin by the German occupation authorities, due to his links with the French Resistance.

See also
Communes of the Rhône department

References

Communes of Rhône (department)